Arum byzantinum is a species of flowering plant in the family Araceae. It was described in 1836.

Description
Arum byzantinum is a small tuberous herb that spreads clonally through horizontal rhizomatous tubers. Flowering takes place from late May to early June; flowers are borne on a spadix that produces an unpleasant smell. Spadices are 4.5-10 centimetres long and have club-shaped, purple appendices.

Habitat
The species is endemic to northwest Turkey, where it grows in deciduous woodland, hedgerows, and damp areas.

Taxonomy
Within the genus Arum, it belongs to subgenus Arum, section Arum. A. byzantinum is diploid, with a chromosome count of 2n = 28.

The species should not be confused with Arum byzantinum , a junior synonym of Arum concinnatum . Although often sold as A. byzantinum in the horticultural trade, A. concinnatum is a more widespread, larger hexaploid species with large, yellow spadices.

References

External links

Garden plants of Europe
Flora of Turkey
byzantinum